Cates is a surname. Notable people with the surname include:

Challen Cates, American actress
Clifton Bledsoe Cates (1893–1970), 19th Commandant of the U.S. Marine Corps
David Allan Cates (born 1956), American novelist
George Cates (1911-2002), American musical conductor associated with Lawrence Welk
George Edward Cates, English recipient of the Victoria Cross in World War I
Gilbert Cates, American film director
Kristy Cates, American stage actress and singer
Michael Cates, Lucasian Professor of Mathematics at Cambridge University
Miriam Cates, British Member of Parliament elected 2019
Noah Cates (born 1999), American ice hockey player
Phoebe Cates (born 1963), American film actress
Richard Cates (1925-2011), American lawyer and politician

Fictional 
Bertram Cates, character in the play Inherit the Wind (play)